Alseis lugonis is a species of flowering plant in the family Rubiaceae. It is endemic to Ecuador.

References

External links 
 Alseis in the World Checklist of Rubiaceae

Dialypetalantheae
Endemic flora of Ecuador
Near threatened plants
Taxonomy articles created by Polbot